The 2006 Real Salt Lake season was the second season of the team's existence.  The team has some improvement over the previous season.  However, despite mixed results on the field, RSL scored a huge victory off the field in 2006. After much controversy and debate, the franchise finally secured a guarantee for a state-of-the-art, soccer-specific stadium to be built in Sandy – a suburb of Salt Lake City. The team broke ground for the structure on the morning of August 12, with representatives from soccer giant Real Madrid present.  That evening, RSL faced its namesake in front of a sellout crowd of 45,511 fans at Rice-Eccles Stadium. Salt Lake made a good showing, but Real Madrid won the exhibition match, 2-0.

Squad

2006 roster

Competitions

Major League Soccer

League table

Western Conference

Overall

Results summary

Regular season

April

May

June

July

August

September

October

U.S. Open Cup

Third round 

2006
Real Salt Lake
Real Salt Lake
Real Salt Lake